The Flinders River is the longest river in Queensland, Australia, at approximately . It was named in honour of the explorer Matthew Flinders.  The catchment is sparsely populated and mostly undeveloped.  The Flinders rises on the western slopes of the Great Dividing Range in North West Queensland and flows generally north-west through the Gulf Country, across a large, flat clay pan, before entering the Gulf of Carpentaria.

Course and features
The catchment is bordered to the south by the Selwyn Range.

At  in length, it is the eighth-longest river in Australia. The primary land use in the catchment is grazing and other agriculture, the catchment covers 1.5% of the continent.

A total of 36 tributaries flow into the Flinders, the principal ones being the Cloncurry, Saxby and the Corella rivers. Another major tributary is Porcupine Creek, which has carved out a dramatic gorge located in the Porcupine Gorge National Park. There are two dams on the river - the Flinders River Dam and Corella Dam. Other smaller tributaries include: Range Creek, Morepork Creek, Oxley Creek, Canterbury Creek, Dutton River, Back Valley Creek, L-Tree Creek, Gorman Creek, Hazlewood Creek, Nonda Creek, Eurimpy Creek, Yambore Creek, Bynoe River and Armstrong Creek. The river flows through one permanent waterhole, Flagstone waterhole.

Several towns are located within the catchment including: McKinlay, Burke and Wills Junction, Hughenden, Richmond, Julia Creek and Cloncurry.

The riverbed is composed of silt with clay and sand, sand and gravel, and gravel with cobble. A large, flat clay pan is located in the area where the Flinders, Gregory and Leichhardt Rivers enter the Gulf. The mouth of the river lies in the Gulf Plains Important Bird Area.

In 2015, the population living within the catchment was 6,600.

Flora
Vegetation along the river in the upper catchment includes riparian woodlands composed of paperbarks including; Melaleuca argentea, Melaleuca bracteata and Melaleuca fluviatilis and sub-dominant eucalypts including  River Red Gum, Coolabah, with minor Bauhinia. Other species found include the wattle. Infestations of weeds such as Prickly acacia, Noogoora burr, Rubber vine and Chonky apple are also found. The understorey is dominated by a closed cover of riparian grasses including native couch on the sandy loams adjacent the stream channels.

History

The traditional owners of the area are the Kalkadoon, Mitakoodi, Kukatj, Guthaarn, Mayi-Yapi, Mayi-Kulan, Mayi-Thakurti, Ngawun, Wanamara, Mbara, Yirandali and Gugu-Badhun peoples, who have inhabited the area for thousands of years.

Jirandali (also known as Yirandali, Warungu, and Yirandhali) is an Australian Aboriginal language of North-West Queensland, particularly the Hughenden area. The language region includes the local government area of the Shire of Flinders, including Dutton River, Flinders River, Mount Sturgeon, Caledonia, Richmond, Corfield, Winton, Torrens, Tower Hill, Landsborough Creek, Lammermoor, Hughenden, and Tangorin.

Wanamarra (also known as Maykulan and Wunumura) is an Australian Aboriginal language in North West Queensland. The language region includes areas within the Shire of McKinlay, Shire of Cloncurry and Shire of Richmond, including the Flinders River area, and the towns of Kynuna and Richmond.

Dalleburra (also known as Dalebura, Dal-leyburra, Yirandali) is a language of North-West Queensland, particularly Lammermoor Station via Hughenden. The Dalleburra language region includes the local government boundaries of the Flinders Shire Council.

Stokes charted and surveyed the estuary of the Flinders and Albert rivers, and named many other features in the area, including Disaster Inlet, Morning Inlet and the Van Diemen River.

Robert O'Hara Burke, William John Wills and Charles Gray reached the river delta in 1861, completing the goal of their expedition to cross the continent from south to north. Gray died on the journey back to Cooper Creek, and both Burke and Wills died after reaching the creek to find their depot abandoned.

The first pastoralist to stock country along the Flinders was James Gibson who established Prairie Station in 1861. In 1864 more cattle stations were established by Gibson including Millungera and Taldora Stations.

Massive flooding occurred along the river in July 1870. One station lost over 4,000 sheep and roads were cut. In 1917 even larger floods were recorded, with Hughenden inundated several people drowned. More heavy flooding occurred in 1955, 1960, 1974, 1991 and 2000.

In 2003, licences to take water from the river were first released when a pastoralist, Corbett Tritton, applied for an irrigation licence. He successfully grew crops like sorghum and cotton on his cattle station and soon other graziers were interested. A moratorium on the issuing of licences followed, but was lifted in 2013.

Heavy rainfall in Queensland in early 2019 resulted in major flooding along the Flinders, considered the worst in half a century. The broad flood plain has allowed the Flinders to stretch as wide as 60 km. The rising water also caused devastation to farmers with heavy losses to cattle herds.

See also

References

External links

Rivers of Queensland
North West Queensland
Gulf of Carpentaria